Arun Pandian is an Indian actor, filmmaker and politician. He began his career as an actor as part of the critically acclaimed film Oomai Vizhigal (1986). After retiring from acting, he took the post of chief producer for the London-based Ayngaran International, a film production and distribution company, however, he later started his own production and distribution company A&P Groups.

He is the secretary of South Indian Film Financiers Association (Siffa) and he is also the president of South Indian Film Exporters Association (Sifea).

Politics
He became a Member of Legislative Assembly in 2011 after contesting in the Tamil Nadu Legislative Assembly election as a Desiya Murpokku Dravida Kazhagam (DMDK) candidate for the constituency of Peravurani. On 21 February 2016, Arun Pandian and nine other MLAs tendered their resignations prior to the Assembly election in the state. On 25 February 2016, he joined the All India Anna Dravida Munnetra Kazhagam (AIADMK) in the presence of party general secretary and Tamil Nadu chief minister Jayalalithaa.

Family and education

He is son of retired Lieutenant colonel D. P. Chellaiah and resides in Tirunelveli. His late brother C. Durai Pandian directed the film Uzhiyan (1994) with Arun Pandian starring in the lead role. He has three daughters, named Kavitha Pandian, Kirana Pandian, and Keerthi Pandian. He holds a Bachelors in economics from Madras University. His daughter Keerthi Pandian and his niece Ramya Pandian are working as actresses.

Filmography

As actor

As producer

As distributor
Sakka Podu Podu Raja (2017)
Velaikkaran (2017)
Maayavan (2017)
Sarkar (2018)
Viswasam (2019)

References

External links
 

20th-century Indian male actors
Tamil male actors
Male actors from Tamil Nadu
Living people
1958 births
Tamil Nadu MLAs 2011–2016
Desiya Murpokku Dravida Kazhagam politicians
University of Madras alumni
Male actors in Tamil cinema
Indian male film actors
Male actors in Kannada cinema
Indian actor-politicians
21st-century Indian male actors
Male actors in Telugu cinema
Film directors from Tamil Nadu
Tamil film directors
Film producers from Tamil Nadu
Tamil film producers